Tom Peloso  is an American musician. He is a current active member of the indie rock band Modest Mouse.  Peloso has played with Modest Mouse since their 2004 album, Good News for People Who Love Bad News, including their latest release, The Golden Casket.  He also plays in his own band, Tom Peloso and The Virginia Sheiks.

Before joining Modest Mouse, Peloso was a founding member of the Charlottesville based bluegrass group The Hackensaw Boys, playing upright bass and fiddle. Two of his songs, "Hobo" and "Sweet Petunia", appear on their album Look Out! On March 1, 2009 Tom Peloso released a digital EP, The Last Saturday of the Year, containing four new tracks recorded in fall 2008 at Monkeyclaus studio.

Personal life
Peloso is the son of Peter and Maureen Peloso.

References

Living people
Alternative rock guitarists
Musicians from Charlottesville, Virginia
Year of birth missing (living people)
20th-century American guitarists
Modest Mouse members
Ugly Casanova members
American male guitarists
20th-century American male musicians